Dearest Idol (1929) is a novel by Australian writer Martin Boyd. It was published under the author's pseudonym "Walter Beckett".

Story outline
The novel is set in Europe and follows the story of a 19-year-old boy named Tony Dawson (called "Boysie" by his by Aunt Matilda). Tony and Matilda have moved to London, and Tony has left school and gone to work in a well-known bank. While working there he meets Boris and the novel explores the friendship that develops between them.

Critical reception
In her PhD thesis titled "Deconstructing Martin Boyd : Homosocial Desire and the Transgressive Aesthetic", Jenny Blain notes in her introduction that "the novel's predominant focus [is] on narcissism, egoism and homosexual possibility. Tony is a monster of vanity and self-love; he also has an infantile fixation on adulation and power."

Notes
Martin Boyd was not acknowledged as the author of this book until this was unearthed in 1977 by Brenda Niall of Monash University and Terence O'Neill of Melbourne University.

See also
 1929 in Australian literature

References

Novels by Martin Boyd
1929 Australian novels
Bobbs-Merrill Company books